Bootstrappers was a band originally composed of guitarist Elliott Sharp, bassist Mike Watt, and drummer George Hurley. After their first album, bassist Mike Watt was replaced by bassist Thom Kotik and drummer George Hurley was replaced by drummer Jan Jakub Kotík.

Discography
Bootstrappers (1989)
Gi=Go (1992)

References

American alternative rock groups